The 2015 Men's Queensland Basketball League season was the 30th running of the competition. The Mackay Meteors won the championship in 2015 to claim their third league title.

The teams for this season were: Brisbane Capitals, Bundaberg Bulls, Cairns Marlins, Gladstone Port City Power, Gold Coast Rollers, Ipswich Force, Logan Thunder, Mackay Meteors, Northside Wizards, Rockhampton Rockets, South West Metro Pirates, Suncoast Clippers, Toowoomba Mountaineers and Townsville Heat.

Team information

Standings

*Every team competed in 17 regular season games over 15 rounds except for the Townsville Heat and Suncoast Clippers. The Round 1 match-up between the two sides was abandoned after the referees couldn't make it to the game due to poor weather in the Maroochydore area.

Finals

*The team that finishes 1st overall goes straight through to the semi-finals.

**The top two teams from each pool face-off in the quarter-finals.

QF 1: 1st in Pool A vs. 2nd in Pool A
QF 2: 1st in Pool B vs. 2nd in Pool C
QF 3: 1st in Pool C vs. 2nd in Pool B

Awards

Player of the Week

Coach of the Month

Statistics leaders

Regular season
 Most Valuable Player: Jeremy Kendle (Toowoomba Mountaineers)
 Coach of the Year: Joel Khalu (Mackay Meteors)
 U23 Youth Player of the Year: Mitch Norton (Townsville Heat)
 All-League Team:
 G: Jeremy Kendle (Toowoomba Mountaineers)
 G: Braydon Hobbs (Mackay Meteors)
 F: Chehales Tapscott (Rockhampton Rockets)
 F: Erron Maxey (Toowoomba Mountaineers)
 C: Dusty Rychart (Brisbane Capitals)

Finals
 Grand Final MVP: Braydon Hobbs (Mackay Meteors)

Notes

References

External links
 2015 QBL Official Draw

2015
2014–15 in Australian basketball
2015–16 in Australian basketball